Yousra is a given name, with variants Yosra or Yusra. It is the feminine equivalent of Yousri or Yousry. 

Notable people with the name include:

Yousra
Yousra (Civene Nessim, born 1955), an Egyptian actress and singer
Yousra Abdel Razek or Yousra Helmy (born 1995), Egyptian table tennis player
Yousra Elbagir (born c. 1982) is a Sudanese-British journalist and writer
Yousra Ben Jemaa (born 1986), Tunisian Paralympian athlete
Yousra Saouf (born 1992), Moroccan singer

Yosra
Yosra Dhieb (born 1995), Tunisian weightlifter
Yosra El Lozy (born 1985), Egyptian actress
Yosra Frawes (fl. from 1995), a Tunisian lawyer and human rights activist

Yusra
Yusra (archaeologist), a Palestinian archaeologist at Mount Carmel 1929–1935
Yusra Alhabsyi (born 1979), an Indonesian politician 
Yusra Mardini (born 1998), Syrian swimmer based in Germany

See also

Yusra dan Yumna, an Indonesian soap opera